D56 or D 56 may refer to:
 D56 road (Croatia), a state road in Croatia
 D 56 road (United Arab Emirates) in Muhaisnah, Dubai Emirate
 GER Class D56, a class of British steam locomotives

and also:
 the ICD-10 code for thalassemia